The Russian Direct Investment Fund (RDIF) is Russia's sovereign wealth fund established in 2011 by the Russian government to make investments in companies of high-growth sectors of the Russian economy. Its mandate is to co-invest alongside the world’s largest institutional investors, direct investment funds, sovereign wealth funds and leading companies. 

RDIF’s reserved capital under management equals $10 billion. RDIF has invested and committed for this purpose 2.1 trillion rubles, of which RDIF invested 200 billion rubles and 1.9 trillion rubles came from co-investors, partners and banks. RDIF also attracted over $40 billion of foreign capital into the Russian economy through long-term strategic partnerships. Kirill Dmitriev is the RDIF's chief executive officer.

History
RDIF was founded in June 2011 under the leadership of both Russian President Dmitry Medvedev and Prime Minister Vladimir Putin.

In June 2012, RDIF and China Investment Corporation (CIC) established the Russian-Chinese Investment Fund. On 2 June 2016, President of the Russian Federation Vladimir Putin signed Federal Law on the Russian Direct Investment Fund changing the status of RDIF. According to the law, RDIF became the sovereign wealth fund of the Russian Federation.

On 28 February 2022, as a result of the 2022 Russian invasion of Ukraine, the United States placed RDIF and its chief executive on its list of sanctioned Russian entities and people. The European Union, Ukraine, United Kingdom and Australia followed later in February and in March. In the recital of the sanction decision, Office of Foreign Assets Control labeled RDIF as a slush fund for Vladimir Putin and as emblematic of Russia’s broader kleptocracy.

RDIF Management
RDIF Management structure includes Supervisory board with the government representatives, and International Advisory Board.

Strategic Partnerships and Investment Platforms

The Russia-China Investment Fund
Together with China Investment Corporation (CIC) RDIF created a $2 billion Russia-China Investment Fund.

RDIF and Mubadala co-investment fund
RDIF and Mubadala Development company (Mubadala), the Abu Dhabi-based investment and development company, agreed to launch a $2 billion co-investment fund to pursue opportunities in Russia.

The Russia-Saudi Investment Fund
RDIF and Saudi Arabia’s sovereign wealth fund, the Public Investment Fund (PIF), have created a partnership to invest in attractive projects in Russia, in areas including infrastructure and agriculture.

The Russia-France Investment Platform
RDIF and Caisse des Dépôts International (CDC International) have launched the Russia-France Investment Platform, which will seek attractive investments across a broad range of sectors and asset classes.

RDIF and Qatar Holding co-investment fund
RDIF and Qatar Holding, the Qatar sovereign wealth fund, announced the launch of co-investment fund.

The Russian-Italian investment platform
RDIF and Fondo Strategico Italiano (FSI) agreed to establish a €1 billion Russian-Italian investment platform. The two financial institutions will invest in companies and projects promoting the development of foreign trade and increase of FDI between Italy and Russia.

The Russia-Japan Investment Fund
RDIF and Japan Bank for International Cooperation (JBIC) established a Russia-Japan Investment Fund (RJIF). RJIF will seek and realise attractive investment projects to promote economic, trade and investment cooperation between Japan and Russia. Under the MoU, RDIF and JBIC have agreed that each of them will invest $500 million for the joint investments through RJIF and a joint investment framework.

Collaboration with Kuwait Investment Authority
RDIF launched an automatic co-investment mechanism, with the first $500 million from Kuwait Investment Authority (KIA). Later KIA doubled its investment with RDIF to $1 billion.

Memorandum of Understanding between RDIF and Mumtalakat
RDIF and Mumtalakat, the investment arm of the Kingdom of Bahrain, signed an MoU to promote investment cooperation between Russia and Bahrain.

Collaboration with Rönesans Holding
RDIF and Rönesans Holding, the leading construction, real estate development and investment company, have reached an agreement to expand the scope of their joint investment activities. The parties are focused on attractive investment opportunities within the Russian Federation; and have identified healthcare, construction, infrastructure and commercial real estate as priority sectors.

The Russia-China Venture Fund
RDIF and Chinese company Tus-Holdings agreed to establish a joint Russia-China Venture Fund (RCVF).

RDIF Investments
RDIF investments are focused on 6 areas:

Improving quality of life
 Mother and child
 Geropharm
 Nationwide cancer diagnosis and treatment network
 Nationwide waste to energy eco-friendly programme
 Detsky Mir
 City hospital No. 40 in St. Petersburg
 Кaro Film
 World Class
 Alium

Infrastructure development
 Construction оf a technopark on the former «Тushino» Аerodrome territory
 Construction of Central Ring Road 3 and 4
 First railway bridge between Russia and China
 Moscow Exchange
 Pulkovo Airport
 Rönesans Holding
 Transneft
 M4 highway (Russia)
 Enel Russia
 Aeroflot
 Inter RAO
 Sovcombank
 Electroshield Samara
 Construction of a motor road in the Krasnodar far western bypass section

Import substitution and export potential
 UFC
 Zapsibneftekhim
 Voltyre-Prom
 Russian Helicopters
 Ust-Luga Marine Terminal
 PhosAgro
 Dakaitaowa
 Arc International
 En+ Group
 C.P. Group
 TH Milk
 Intergeo
 Orenbeef

Regional development
 The construction of small hydroelectric power plants in Karelia
 Elimination of “digital inequality”
 Vladivostok International Airport
 Tigers Realm Coal
 Magnit
 Alrosa
 Lenta (retail)

Efficiency growth
 Cotton Way
 Logistics platform PLT
 Globaltruck
 AutoPartners

Technological development
 AliExpress Russia
 Deliver
 Hyperloop
 Motorika

References

External links

Russian Direct Investment Fund (RDIF) 

Financial services companies established in 2011
Investment companies of Russia
Companies based in Moscow
Government-owned companies of Russia
Russian companies established in 2011
Sovereign wealth funds
Russian entities subject to the U.S. Department of the Treasury sanctions